Robin Lundbäck (born 17 May 1994), known professionally as Boy in Space, is a Swedish singer-songwriter and musician from Alingsås, Sweden. His moniker refers to his personality, which he has described as "spacey". Before starting his solo career, Lundbäck was one of the members in the Swedish boy band JTR. The band participated in the fifth season of The X Factor Australia and has released two studio albums.

Career and background 
Lundbäck was born and raised in Alingsås in Sweden and it's also the place where he currently resides and creates music. His moniker has been described as the following: "To be 'In Space' is to exist in the in-between. It's not quite the beginning but it's so far from the end. It's standing apart from those who've found their conventional fit in this world, and recognizing that to be different is to be special. It's the courage to depart the familiar to a destination unknown. The 'space' is the intensity of youth. The cold sting of heartbreak. The suffocation of betrayal. And the fiery passion of young love". In an interview with Wonderland magazine, Lundbäck said that he was set to perform with American singer and songwriter Alec Benjamin, which he did in 2019. He was supposed to perform solo in London in 2020, but was cancelled or delayed to 2021 or 2022 amid the COVID-19 pandemic. Furthermore, Lundbäck announced a European Tour Support together with Jeremy Zucker and he also was supposed to perform at "Dot to Dot Festival in Manchester, Bristol and Nottingham from 22nd to 24th May 2020. However, the performances were either delayed or cancelled amid the COVID-19 pandemic.

In 2018, Lundbäck released his first single as a solo artist, called "Goodbye". He released two more singles that year, "Give Me" and "California". In 2019, he released the singles "7UP", "Drown" and "Cold", with the latter having received over 50 million streams on Spotify. Lundbäck subsequently released a remix for the song "7UP", which he created with Tiger Tom (Tom Lundbäck), his brother, who also was a member of the band JTR.

His most recent singles include "Caroline" and " u n eye". A music video was also released for the song "Caroline", which by Billboard magazine was described as "Alice in Wonderland-Inspired". The song "u n eye" has been described as a "R&B-infused pop track". Lundbäck has also spoken regarding the songwriting of "Drown", saying that "I [Lundbäck] was actually watching Friends on Netflix and I watched the episode where Ross and Rachel break up. I don't know why, but it made me so irrationally sad. It reminded me of when my parents got divorced when I was younger, and I felt like I had to put that energy somewhere… so I went into the studio and wrote 'Drown' later that day." In 2019, Lundbäck performed the song at Musikhjälpen. He also sang his single "On A Prayer", which in the original features vocals and songwriting from Shy Martin. Lundbäck released a live version of "u n eye" on 27 March 2020. On 1 May 2020, Lundbäck released a cover of Alphavilles song "Forever Young" as a single. Regarding the release of the cover, Lundbäck stated that "The song has a message that is timeless for all generations and I'm proud to join the ever-growing list of talented artists who have covered it." In 2021, he released a song titled "Paradise" with the Norwegian DJ Alan Walker and music producer K-391.

Discography

Extended plays
 Live (2020)
 Frontyard (2021)

Singles

As lead artist

As featured artist

Remixes

With JTR

Albums

Singles

Tours

Supporting 

 Alec Benjamin: Caught in the Middle World Tour (2019)
Jeremy Zucker: love is not dying European Tour (2020; cancelled due COVID-19 pandemic)

References 

Swedish pop singers
Swedish songwriters
21st-century Swedish singers
21st-century Swedish male singers
Year of birth missing (living people)
Living people